Hylotelephium sieboldii (syn. Sedum sieboldii), the October stonecrop, Siebold's stonecrop, Siebold's sedum or October daphne, is a species of flowering plant in the family Crassulaceae, native to Japan. The hot-pink flowers appear in autumn (fall).

The specific epithet sieboldii commemorates Philipp Franz von Siebold, a notable German plant collector of the 19th century.

This plant requires some protection from low temperatures in winter, and is often seen in cultivation as a houseplant or in an alpine garden. The cultivar 'Misebaya-nakafu' has variegated green and cream leaves, and has gained the Royal Horticultural Society's Award of Garden Merit.

References

sieboldii
Plants described in 1839